Marston is a village and a civil parish in Cheshire West and Chester, England. It contains eight buildings that are recorded in the National Heritage List for England as designated listed buildings, all of which are at Grade II. This grade is the lowest of the three gradings given to listed buildings and is applied to "buildings of national importance and special interest". Running through the parish is the Trent and Mersey Canal. The listed buildings consist of a milepost on the canal, a farmhouse and farm building, a war memorial, and four structures associated with the Lion Salt Works. The latter is also a scheduled monument. It is "the only substantially intact example in the county of a works producing white crystal salt by the evaporation method", and houses "the only remaining natural brine pumping open pan salt works in Europe".

See also
Listed buildings in Anderton with Marbury
Listed buildings in Aston by Budworth
Listed buildings in Great Budworth
Listed buildings in Pickmere
Listed buildings in Wincham

References
Citations

Sources

Listed buildings in Cheshire West and Chester
Lists of listed buildings in Cheshire